Mr. E may refer to:

 Mister E, a DC Comics character and member of The Trenchcoat Brigade
 Mister E (Timely Comics), a Timely Comics (now Marvel Comics) character
 Mr. E, a villain in the TV series Ninjago
 Mr. E, a character in the TV series Scooby-Doo! Mystery Incorporated
 Mark Oliver Everett (b. 1963), American lead vocalist and guitarist for Eels
 Nathan Ellery, a DC comics character who masterminded the murder of Alec Holland
 The ring name of professional wrestler Abe Zvonkin while masked
"Mr. E", a song by Red Velvet from the 2018 EP Summer Magic

See also
 E (disambiguation)
 E (name)
 "Mr. E's Beautiful Blues", a 2000 song by Eels